Doomfist is a fictional, playable character in the 2016 video game Overwatch, and again appeared in its 2022 sequel, Overwatch 2. His design is based on a powerful, cybernetic gauntlet. As an offensive, brawler-style character, he uses close-range attacks: a charged punch and slam. Doomfist was released in late July 2017 as the title's 25th hero, and the fourth introduced after the game's launch.   

Overwatch announcement video, in 2014, contained a stray reference to a gauntlet. Following its obsessive popularity with fans, the developer, Blizzard Entertainment, expanded the gauntlet into a full-fledged, playable character. This period included a series of teasers from the developer and a campaign by actor Terry Crews to voice the character. Doomfist was ultimately voiced by Sahr Ngaujah. In Doomfist's fictional backstory, the playable character became the third generation to wield the gauntlet, and is presented as a villain after killing his predecessor and becoming a leader of Talon, the game's nemesis group. A digital comic accompanied the character's release.

Fans were excited by the character's reveal, and professional players praised the balance of his move set. Other critics considered Doomfist too vulnerable to be viable, and insufficiently exciting to rekindle the interest of old players.

Background 

Overwatch is a character-driven shooter video game in which players compose teams based on the complementary skills of characters to win the match's objective, such as capturing an area or escorting a payload. Blizzard Entertainment, the video game's developer, subtly recommends changes in team composition while players select "hero" characters, such that teams evenly distribute the benefits of its character roster's class-based roles: the damage-absorbing "tanks", the damage-dealing "damage", and the team-buffing "support". Over 60 million players have played Overwatch and its professional league similarly has millions of viewers.

Description 

Doomfist is a tank character built as a brawler, with close-range, mostly melee attacks from his cybernetic gauntlet. For example, his Rocket Punch is a charged attack that launches Doomfist in the direction of the player's aim. It does extra damage if it pummels the enemy into a wall. It is useful for finishing enemies in retreat as well as pushing enemies off edges. The Seismic Slam performs a smashing dive to return to the ground. His only non-melee attack is the short-range Hand Cannon, which shoots a shotgun burst of projectiles from the gauntlet's knuckles. Its four shots of ammunition regenerate passively. Doomfist's passive ability regenerates his shields when he deals damage with melee attacks. His "ultimate ability", Meteor Strike, launches Doomfist into the air to drop down on a targeted area, and complements other ultimate abilities that pull enemies together.

These moves are designed to be used in flurry combinations. For instance, the player can Seismic Slam an opponent, which pulls in enemies, and progress into a Rising Uppercut, which tosses the opponent into the air. During that toss, the player can charge the Rocket Punch and release as the opponent returns to the ground. Alternatively, the player can launch into the air, pick an opponent to slam, and punch them at close range. The character is built for aggressive playstyles and advanced players.

Among his advantages, his move combinations contribute to his high mobility, compared to other Overwatch playable characters. Doomfist can easily reach and neutralize enemies occupying high ground, such as snipers. He is most effective against low-mobility opponents, but susceptible to high-mobility opponents, such as Pharah, Soldier: 76, and Sombra. Among his disadvantages, Doomfist is dependent on his abilities to escape groups of enemies, leaving the player helpless when his abilities are unavailable (on cooldown or hacked by Sombra). Doomfist's large "hitbox", or area for taking damage, disadvantages him to characters such as Reaper, Roadhog, and Ana's sleep dart.

In professional games, he works best when flanking the enemy team and isolating single opponents out of position. At his release, he was expected to fit well in the "dive" team compositions popular in professional play, in which aggressive characters such as Genji and Winston harass the enemy at close range. He was also expected to counterbalance diving enemies by pulling them in, uppercutting them into the air, and removing them from the fight. Doomfist was anticipated to perform well on most levels/maps, especially in those with close quarters. Stationary barrier characters (such as Reinhardt and Orisa), though popular in professional team compositions, cannot protect Doomfist, who instead benefits more from Zarya's barrier bubble ability.

Some of the character's costume customization options ("skins") relate to his fictional cultural heritage, such as the orisha gods of the Yoruba religion and the African ceremonial mask tradition. Doomfist's other aesthetic customization options allude to the boxer Muhammad Ali, the combo sequences of fighting video games, and other pop culture references.

In March 2022, Blizzard confirmed that Doomfist's role is a tank in Overwatch 2. Doomfist's Uppercut will be eliminated, replaced by a Power Block ability that will let him absorb frontal damage for a short time. His other offensive abilities are weakened to a degree but will be given more health to reflect his tank status. Blizzard explained that rather than having to heavily refine Doomfist's offensive capabilities which had become overpowered, transitioning him to a tank still made him a threatening force that could break up off defensive groups.

Development 

Doomfist was a stray reference in Overwatchs original animated short whose obsessive popularity with fans led the development team to expand his lore with in-game references in the game's Numbani map. In the cinematic video used to announce the game in 2014, a boy is excited to see Doomfist's gauntlet on display behind glass at the Overwatch museum. Doomfist's gauntlet was a plot device, and the developers had not planned to create a character to wield it. Overwatch Creative Director Chris Metzen played with compound nouns to give the gauntlet a name reminiscent of a shotgun. The developers expanded the gauntlet into a Doomfist character in bits. In particular, they decided to use the gauntlet as the centerpiece for the game's Numbani environment, in which the gauntlet is encased in the map's objective, the payload, to be delivered to a Doomfist exhibit at a museum. By late 2015, the team decided Doomfist would be a generational hero, like that of superhero universes, were he to be a full-fledged playable character, the fourth additional character to be added to game, and 25th on the roster.

In designing the character, Blizzard's Geoff Goodman said they crafted Doomfist as an "ode to the fighting genre", both in his skill kit and in concept art. Though Blizzard tried to keep all of his attacks as melee, they found, as they had with Genji, that Doomfist needed some type of ranged attack to make him playable; an early attack had been a phantom punch that would have been launched from his fist. Doomfist had also be considered as a Tank class, but Blizzard did not want to make the mistake again of having a high-health character with powerful attacks as they had initially with Roadhog at the game's introduction. At one point during development, Doomfist would have been able to pick up enemies and use them as human shields or to throw them, but Blizzard dropped this as he was not supposed to be a wrestler or luchador, according to Goodman. They also dropped an ability for him to grab pieces of the ground and throw them. His ultimate ability was originally designed for Orisa, the character introduced prior to Doomfist.

Actor and former American football player Terry Crews generated support on social media in his bid to voice the character, which included a mock audition, a visit to the developer's headquarters, an endorsement from fellow actor Dwayne Johnson, and a fan campaign. The character was ultimately voiced by Sahr Ngaujah, who previously appeared in Money Monster and Stomp the Yard. Blizzard's Michael Chu explained that when they were casting for Doomfist specifically looking for "something very specific given his role in the game", Ngaujah's audition significantly impressed them, along with his ability to deliver many different "flavors" that they needed for the character. Crews ultimately felt that Ngaujah was a better fit for Doomfist, and was pleased to have been included, instead, in Microsoft's Crackdown 3. Chu did not rule out using Crews elsewhere within Overwatch.

In the lead-up to Blizzard's official announcement of the playable character, the developers teased his release by modifying the Doomfist gauntlet in Numbani to appear to be stolen from its glass case. Blizzard finally confirmed the Doomfist's development with a teaser trailer in early July 2017, a week after news of the release leaked through the game's crash logs. The reveal cinematic was drawn in an anime-style by Wolf Smoke Studio, based in Shanghai, who had previously expressed and rallied interest in developing an anime in the game's fictional universe. Blizzard also sent an official Doomfist cosplayer to the San Diego Comic-Con and Overwatch World Cup Sydney qualifier. Soon after the reveal, Doomfist became playable on the game's test servers, where some of the character's powers were rebalanced to reduce punch distance and vertical mobility. The character was released for all platforms on July 27, 2017.

Lore 

Doomfist is presented as a "generational" character who, like the Green Lantern or the Flash, has passed through two generational eras in which he was known to the fictional world as "The Savior" and "The Scourge". The playable Doomfist is the character's third incarnation, labeled "The Successor" as the third person to be called "Doomfist".

Doomfist is one of the villains of the Overwatch fictional universe. In the backstory of the third Doomfist, Akande Ogundimu is presented as the villainous heir to a prosthetics company in Nigeria who splits his time between expanding the company and martial arts training. During the game's "Omnic War" between humans and rogue Omnic robots, Ogundimu lost his right arm. His prosthetic replacement impressed the second Doomfist (Akinjide Adeyemi), who then trained Ogundimu as his successor, but the student later killed his teacher to claim the gauntlet for himself. Ogundimu became a leader of the Talon group, the nemesis organization to Overwatch, and advocates for his belief that forces of conflict will strengthen humanity. At some point prior to the game's present, Overwatch's Winston, a playable character from the game, defeats Doomfist and puts the titular gauntlet behind glass in the Overwatch museum, as referenced in the original Overwatch announcement video. Blizzard's first teaser for Doomfist's release shows a fictional news report about Talon freeing Doomfist from prison to steal the gauntlet. Blizzard had modified the Numbani level during its release of Orisa, the previous playable character released for the game, to imply that Doomfist had attacked the city and stolen the gauntlet; notably, the payload casing had been broken open and the gauntlet missing.

A digital comic accompanied the playable character's release, featuring Doomfist in a James Bond-esque casino setting. Masquerade establishes the character's motivations and competition following his release from prison.

Reception 

Upon Doomfist's official announcement, Kotaku reported the fan reaction as "beyond excited". Fan anticipation for the character rivaled that for Sombra, a character released the previous year with a prolonged reveal period. Players had hoped for the release of Doomfist each time Blizzard had revealed an additional character for the game. Polygon wrote that Doomfist's announcement cinematic, drawn in an anime style, was the best in the series to date. Fans who had lobbied for Terry Crews to play Doomfist's voice were disappointed to discover his absence, but Sahr Ngaujah's performance was praised at the time of Doomfist's formal unveiling, and fans received the character positively anyway. Blizzard's choice of Ngaujah over the higher profile Crews also meant that the voice actor would be more available to reappear for additional recording and other game community events. Doomfist also fulfilled Overwatch sore lack of a supervillain, according to IGN, in a cast of other morally ambiguous but tragic and redeemable characters. The critic anticipated Doomfist as the start of Blizzard making Talon into a villainous organization à la Legion of Doom (Justice League) or Masters of Evil (Avengers).

Heroes Never Die, an Overwatch-specific news spinoff site by Polygon, wrote that Doomfist's style was wholly unlike that of the other characters, and created a "feast or famine" scenario in which the character is only helpful when engaged in risky, aggressive play. The site expected Doomfist's release to affect team character selections to maximize Doomfist's strengths, weaknesses, and synergies. PC Gamer praised Doomfist's balance against the other characters just prior to his launch. Professional players complimented the addition of a strong, counterable character to disrupt the common, uncounterable characters normally played in the professional circuit. Another commended the idea of fighting game-style combos in a first-person shooter for adding an additional skill ceiling for players to pursue. Kotaku, however, considered Doomfist a better fit for a Marvel vs. Capcom fighting game than Overwatch, and bemoaned the character's vulnerability to snipers, low health, and lack of escape options, which made him less threatening or even unrewarding. Even as Doomfist's design was neat, Waypoint critic thought, the character was not exciting or enough of an extrinsic motivator to reclaim players who had dropped out from its player base. Other reviewers, however, found simple joy in pulling off punches and combos.

At the time of Doomfist's release, the Overwatch meta-game was favoring "dive" compositions, using a character that can jump over a great distance like Winston or D.Va. Players using these characters would self-sacrifice themselves by jumping into or behind an enemy front-line, and do as much damage as possible, distracting that team from a major push. About a month after Doomfist's addition, the "dive" strategy had become readily countered as Doomfist can quickly eliminate either the singular threat or the oncoming group particularly when coupled with crowd-control skills like Zarya's or Reinhardt's ultimates.

References

External links 

 
 Pages on Gamepedia and Wikia wikis, for character stats and additional plot details

Amputee characters in video games
Black people in comics
Black characters in video games
Comics characters introduced in 2017
Cyborg characters in video games
Fictional gamblers
Fictional mixed martial artists
Fictional Nigerian people
Fictional prison escapees
Male characters in comics
Male characters in video games
Overwatch characters
Video game characters introduced in 2017
Male video game villains